Richard Moore (born 2 February 1981) is an English former professional rugby league footballer who last played as a  for Hunslet in Betfred League 1.

Background
Moore was born in Keighley, West Yorkshire, England

Playing career
He previously played for the Bradford Bulls (Heritage №), London Broncos (Heritage № 396), Leigh Centurions (Heritage № 1234), Wakefield Trinity Wildcats (Heritage № tbc), Crusaders RL, Leeds Rhinos (Heritage №), Halifax (Heritage № 1330) and Featherstone Rovers (Heritage № tbc).

Moore originally started his career in the Leeds Rhinos Academy but never made a first team appearance. He then played for Bradford Bulls, London Broncos and Leigh Centurions, before joining Wakefield Trinity ahead of the 2007 season. Moore missed the start of the 2009 season after being diagnosed with Crohn's disease. He left Wakefield at the end of the 2010 season to join Crusaders.

On 12 August 2011, Moore re-signed for Leeds, the club where he began his career as an academy player, but failed to make a first team appearance. He then had a second spell at Wakefield Trinity Wildcats in the 2014 season.

References

External links

 (archived by web.archive.org) Richard Moore Wildcats Profile
"Leigh prop Moore has ban reduced" from BBC
 (archived by web.archive.org) Hunslet Hawks profile
Featherstone Rovers profile
Leeds Rhinos profile

1981 births
Living people
Bradford Bulls players
Crusaders Rugby League players
English rugby league players
Featherstone Rovers players
Halifax R.L.F.C. players
Hunslet R.L.F.C. players
Keighley Cougars players
Leeds Rhinos players
Leigh Leopards players
London Broncos players
Rugby league players from Keighley
Rugby league props
Wakefield Trinity players